Appointment with Adventure is an American dramatic anthology program that was broadcast from April 3, 1955, until April 1, 1956, on CBS.

Format and actors
Appointment with Adventure presented stories whose settings varied among locations in the United States and in places in the world beyond U.S. borders. Some stories were contemporary, while others were period pieces set in World War II, the U.S. Civil War, and other eras.

The program had no regular cast. Guest stars who appeared in episodes included Jack Lord, Patricia Breslin, Jack Klugman, Barbara Britton, Edie Adams, James Daly, Neville Brand, Viveca Lindfors, Theodore Bikel, Kim Hunter, Polly Bergen, Betsy Palmer, Gena Rowlands, Phyllis Kirk, Dane Clark, Tony Randall, Gene Barry, and Paul Newman.

Production
Appointment with Adventure was produced by Talent Associates. David Susskind was the executive producer, with Robert Stevens as producer and director. Writers included Rod Serling, Anne Howard Bailey, Jean-Charles Tacchella, and Newton Meltzer. Revlon and P. Lorillard Company were the sponsors. It was broadcast live  from 10 to 10:30 p.m. Eastern Time.

Extension of the program's original contract was announced on November 25, 1955, two weeks before the contract would have ended. Subsequently it was scheduled to end with the March 18, 1955, broadcast, to be replaced by The $64,000 Challenge. The new show was not ready, however, so two more episodes were shown.

Critical reception
A review in The New York Times after Appointment with Adventure'''s first two episodes described the first as "a sorry ordeal" and the second as "interesting entertainment". In contrast, a review in the trade publication Billboard'' said, "The first installment . . . had an attractive cast, a highly realistic setting, and a tense, tho  sometimes ambiguous, script." Gene Plotnik added, "Jourdan and Dauphin turned in their usual suave and charming performances", and he described Powers's performance as "remarkably exciting".

Selected episodes

 April 3, 1955 -- "Minus Three Thousand" with Claude Dauphin, Louis Jourdan, and Mala Powers. 
 April 10, 1955 --  "Five in Judgment" with Jack Lord, Paul Newman; and Patricia Breslin. 
 November 27, 1955 -- "Time Bomb" -- Chester Morris, Jean Bal, Anthony Eisley.

References 

1955 American television series debuts
1956 American television series endings
1950s American television series
American live television series
CBS original programming